Vital Philomene Borkelmans (born 10 June 1963) is a Belgian football coach and a former left fullback who mainly played for Club Brugge (350 matches with that club), in the Belgian First Division. He also played for Patro Eisden, SV Waregem, Gent and Cercle Brugge. Vital played with Belgium and was in the team for the 1994 and 1998 World Cups. In January 2010, he was appointed manager of Dender EH in the Belgian Second Division, but fired following the relegation to the Belgian Third Division following the 2011–12 season. In July 2012, Vital Borkelmans was revealed as assistant manager to Marc Wilmots for the Belgium national football team.

In 2018, he was appointed as the head coach of Jordan, until his resignation in June 2021.

Managerial statistics

Player palmares
Club Brugge

Belgian First Division (4): 1989–90, 1991–92, 1995–96, 1997–98
Belgian Cup (3): 1990–91, 1994–95, 1995–96
Belgian Super Cup (6): 1990, 1991, 1992, 1994, 1996, 1998

References

External links

1963 births
Living people
Belgian footballers
Belgian Pro League players
Challenger Pro League players
K. Patro Eisden Maasmechelen players
Cercle Brugge K.S.V. players
K.S.V. Waregem players
Club Brugge KV players
Association football central defenders
Belgium international footballers
K.A.A. Gent players
1994 FIFA World Cup players
1998 FIFA World Cup players
Association football defenders
2019 AFC Asian Cup managers
Belgian football managers
Belgian expatriate sportspeople in Jordan
Jordan national football team managers
Expatriate football managers in Jordan
F.C.V. Dender E.H. managers
Belgian expatriate football managers
People from Maaseik
Footballers from Limburg (Belgium)